Younis Amaan is an  Omani football player and coach. He played as a forward, earning 65 caps for the Oman national team and appearing at three Arabian Gulf Cups.

At the club level, Amaan appeared for Dhofar and Mirbat. He was five times the top scorer of the Oman Professional League, as well as the 1986 Gulf Club Champions Cup. During his seven seasons at Mirbat, Amaan also coached the club's youth teams; during his final two seasons, he served as a player-coach with the senior team.

Amaan continued as a coach after his playing retirement, earning his C and B licenses from the Asian Football Confederation. In his first head coaching position, he helped Al-Ittihad earn promotion from the Oman First Division League. After seasons at Al-Hilal and Dhofar, Amaan would spend four more spells in charge of Al-Ittihad, the last of those seeing him take over in midseason and ending in relegation. He took over Salalah at the midpoint of the 2015–16 season with the club sitting on the bottom of the table, but was unable to improve the position as Salalah were relegated.

Outside of coaching, Amaan worked as a studio analyst for Al Jazeera Sport during the 19th Arabian Gulf Cup. He has been a frequent critic of the Oman Football Association and football administration in the country, calling for an increase in the professionalism of the Oman Professional League and critiquing the performances of the national team.

References

External links

 

Living people
Year of birth missing (living people)
Omani footballers
Omani football managers
People from Salalah
Association football forwards
Dhofar Club players
Oman Professional League players
Oman international footballers
Al-Ittihad Club (Salalah) managers
Salalah SC managers
Dhofar Club managers
Oman Professional League managers